Mukhammat Sabirov (March 29, 1932 – March 9, 2015) was a Russian engineer and politician. Sabirov served as the first Prime Minister of Tatarstan from 1991 to 1995.

Sabirov began a lengthy career as an engineer at Almetievskburneft in 1955. He served as the first Prime Minister of Tatarstan, the head of government of the republic, from 1991 to 1995.

Sabirov died on March 9, 2015, at the age of 82. His memorial service was held at the national culture centre in Kazan, Tatarstan, on March 10, 2015. Dignitaries in attendance at the service included current Prime Minister of Tatarstan Ildar Khalikov and former President and state counsellor, Mintimer Shaimiev. Sabirov was buried in Arsk cemetery in Kazan.

References

1932 births
2015 deaths
Prime Ministers of Tatarstan
Politicians of Tatarstan
20th-century Russian engineers
Tatar people